Holmside Hall is an early 19th-century farmhouse and equestrian centre at Holmside, Burnhope, County Durham, England.

The farm is built on the site of a medieval manor house which until 1570 was the home of Robert Tempest (High Sheriff of Durham in 1561). The family lost the manor by confiscation following his attainder for his part in the Rising of the North in 1569.

The site contains the remains of a medieval moat and the farm outbuildings contain walls and fragments of the medieval manor house. The farmhouse and outbuildings are Grade II listed buildings and the whole site is a Scheduled Ancient Monument.

Holmside New Hall, sometimes known as Little Holmside, is a nearby 17th-century house one time home of the Whittingham family.

References
  English Heritage: Images of England, architectural description of listed building, Holmside Hall farmhouse
  English Heritage: Images of England, architectural description of liste building, Holmside Hall barn
  English Heritage: Images of England, architectural description of listed building, Holmside Hall shed

Grade II listed buildings in County Durham
Scheduled monuments in County Durham
Tempest family